The amount of Cambodian films dropped from more than 60 in 2006 to less than 10 in 2009. All films released in this year were only available in theaters. Many directors turned to producing long Khmer soap operas rather than actual movies. However, Davy Chou's "The Twin Diamond'produced by Kun Khmer Kone Khmer and "Vanished"produced by KMF are promising to enhance the Khmer film industry :

2009

See also
2009 in Cambodia

References

2009
Films
Cambodian